Cheongju University is a private university located in Cheongju City, the capital of North Chungcheong province, South Korea.

Academics
Undergraduate studies at the university are divided among eight colleges:  Economics & Business Administration, Law, Humanities, Science & Engineering, Education, Arts, Social Sciences, and the Evening College (which offers part-time evening instruction in diverse subject areas).  Graduate programs are provided through five graduate schools:  Higher Education, Industrial Engineering, Public Administration, Business Administration, and Education.  In addition, several research institutes operate on the campus.  These include the Research Institute of Industrial Management, the Industrial Science Research Institute, the Information and Communication Research Center, and two business incubators:  the Technology & Business Incubator and the Internet Business Incubating Center.

History
The school opened its doors as Cheongju Commercial College (청주상과대학) on June 6, 1947.  It became simply Cheongju College in 1951.  It gained university status in 1981.  A second campus was constructed near the first one in 1989.

Notable people
Jung Jin-young, singer and actor (B1A4)
Kang Suk-jung, actor
Kim Young-ho, actor
Lee Jin-wook, actor
Park Seong-ho, comedian
Song Il-gook, actor
Kim Ji-eun, actress
Kwangchul Youn (born 1966), operatic bass and academic voice teacher

See also
Cheongju National University of Education (another nearby university)
List of colleges and universities in South Korea
Education in South Korea

External links
Official school website, in English, Korean, and Chinese

Universities and colleges in North Chungcheong Province
Cheongju
Educational institutions established in 1947
1947 establishments in South Korea